The Brooklyn Fair is an annual agricultural fair held in Brooklyn, Connecticut for the first time in 1809. It is considered the oldest agricultural fair in the United States.

The fair is organized by the Windham County Agricultural Society

History

 In 1809, the first year of the fair, it was held on the site of what is currently known as the Vanilla Bean Cafe 
 In the following years, the event was hosted in rotation in Woodstock, Brooklyn, and Pomfret, Connecticut
 About 10 years after the first fair, in 1820, the ~100 founders incorporated in the Windham County Agricultural Society.
 In the year 2000 the Society was recognized for its efforts by the Library of Congress in its "Bicentennial Local Legacies Project" as part of its 200th Anniversary celebration.
 No fair was held in 1917–18 because of World War I, 1942–45 because of World War II, or 2020 due to the COVID-19 pandemic.

Entertainment

References

Recurring events established in 1809
Festivals in Connecticut
Tourist attractions in Windham County, Connecticut
1809 establishments in Connecticut
Agricultural shows in the United States